Maurizio Thermes (born August 14, 1939 in Rome) is a retired Italian professional football player.

His professional debut game for A.S. Roma in the 1958/59 season remained the only Serie A game in his career.

External links
Profile at Enciclopediadelcalcio

1939 births
Living people
Italian footballers
Serie A players
A.S. Roma players
A.S. Sambenedettese players
Calcio Foggia 1920 players
Modena F.C. players
Cosenza Calcio 1914 players

Association football midfielders